Pimelodus pohli is a species of catfish belonging to the family Pimelodidae. It is only found in the São Francisco River, Brazil, and its tributaries.

Smaller, younger members of this species (under  standard length) have the grey body marked with four rows of small dark spots, larger specimens tending to be plain grey. The species reaches a maximum length of  standard length. It has a rather deep body with a large eye and noticeably protruding upper jaw. The maxillary barbels are very long, reaching the deeply forked caudal fin, when stretched along the body. Among the other characteristics which distinguish it from its congeners is the rather long adipose fin.

The specific name honours the Austrian naturalist Johann Baptist Emanuel Pohl, who collected specimens in the São Francisco basin in the 19th Century.

References

 

Pimelodus
Catfish of South America
Fish of the São Francisco River basin
Endemic fauna of Brazil
Taxa named by Frank Raynner Vasconcelos Ribeiro
Taxa named by Carlos Alberto Santos de Lucena
Fish described in 2006